Sinseollo or royal hot pot is an elaborate dish consisting of meatballs, small and round jeonyueo (전유어), mushrooms, and vegetables cooked in a rich broth in Korean royal court cuisine. The dish is a form of jeongol (elaborate chowder-like stew). It is served in a large bundt pan-shaped vessel with a hole in the center, in which hot embers are placed to keep the dish hot throughout the meal.

Etymology and history
Sinseollo is the proper name for the cooking vessel in which this dish is served, which has come to mean the actual dish as well. Sinseollo is a composite word of sinseon (hangul:신선, hanja:神仙), "Taoist immortal spirit" and ro (hangul:로, hanja:爐), brazier. Jeong Hee-Ryang (정희량), a scholar in the court of Joseon Dynasty's King Yeonsan, turned to a hermit-like life in the mountains after being exiled and disillusioned from politics. He made a small brazier to cook his meals, a portable cooking vessel that would cook various vegetables in a single pot. He disappeared in the mountains and legend says he became a sinseon, so the cooking vessel was named "brazier for a sinseon".

Sinseollo is also called yeolguja tang, which literally means "a tang (soup) that makes a mouth happy".

Preparation and serving

Although the origin of the dish was based on vegetables, meat and fish were added in later years. Up to 25 ingredients may be used in making the dish, such as beef, pork, chicken, pheasant, fish, abalone, sea cucumbers, and various vegetables. Boiled beef and sliced mu are placed in the dish with seasoned beef and the seafood. Mushrooms, carrots and other vegetables are placed next, with meatballs, walnuts, pine nuts, ginkgo nuts, and finely shredded red pepper used as garnish to create a colorful balance. Soup stock is poured over and then the dish is cooked with charcoal in the burner.

See also
 Gujeolpanalso the new real plate
 Korean royal court cuisine
 List of cooking vessels
 List of soups
 Korean cuisine
 Dae Jang Geum

References

External links
Information and recipe of sinseollo from Korea Foundation
Best Culinary Day Tour in Seoul from Korea Tourism Organization
General information on Korean cuisine and recipe from Seoul city official website
 Information about Korean royal court cuisine and sinseollo
 Information about sinseollo
 Information about sinseollo

Korean soups and stews
Korean royal court cuisine
Cooking vessels